Forever Still is a Danish modern rock/alternative metal band founded in 2013 in Copenhagen by Maja Shining and Mikkel Haastrup.

History
They were formed in 2013, Copenhagen, where their first EP Breaking Free was released. In 2014 they released their second EP Scars. Everything that frontwoman Maja Shining and multi-instrumentalist Mikkel Haastrup achieved until now has been produced by the band members themselves. Over years they organized their tours, took photos, made their cover art and music videos as well as recorded, mixed and produced everything on their own. Tied Down was recorded together with Flemming Rasmussen, who formerly worked as a producer for Metallica.

After releasing their EP Save me in 2015, they toured in the United Kingdom and Italy. After that they released their first album Tied Down. In August 2016 they signed a worldwide contract with Nuclear Blast. Tied down was then re-released by their new label and nominated for a Metal Hammer Award for "best debut album". It was critically acclaimed and the band became even more popular.

In the fall of 2016 they were touring through Europe with the Italian metal band Lacuna Coil and in the spring of 2017 they toured with Children of Bodom. In 2017 they opened the main stage of Bloodstock Open Air. The band has since then played multiple festivals across Europe like Sabaton Open Air and Summer Breeze Open Air. In 2019 they released their second album "Breathe in Colours" via Nuclear Blast and in the fall of 2019 they toured the album with Cellar Darling and Beyond the Black throughout Europe. In the winter of 2019, they joined the Female Metal Voices Tour with Leaves' Eyes and Sirenia amongst others.

The band is currently finishing their third album The Line that was written during lock down. Maja and Mikkel, who are in charge of the songwriting in the band, gathered all the equipment they could get their hands on in the house and started writing a very different album for the band. Inspired by bands like Joy Division, Nine Inch Nails and The Cure, they began to explore a more minimalist sound with the old drum machines and analogues synthesizers they had gathered.

Band members 
Current line-up
 Maja Shining – vocals, piano, synth, theremin
 Mikkel Haastrup – bass, guitars, keyboards, synth

Live members
 Inuuteq Kleemann – guitar (live)
 Viktor Enebjörn - Drums (live)

Discography

EPs 
 2013: Breaking Free
 2014: Scars
 2015: Save Me

Albums 
 2016: Tied Down
 2019: Breathe in Colours

Singles 
 2013: The Key
 2013: The Last Day
 2013: Towards the Edge
 2014: Scars
 2015: Awake the Fire
 2016: Miss Madness
 2016: Save Me
 2016: Miss Madness (Acoustic)
 2019: Rew1nd
 2019: Breathe in Colours
 2019: Is It Gone?
 2019: Perfect Day (Lou Reed cover)
 2022: Something Wrong
 2022: Can't Begin To Explain

References

External links 
Official Website

Danish heavy metal musical groups
2013 establishments in Denmark
Alternative metal musical groups